Michael Elmer Dahl Nielsen (nicknamed Mio; born 11 February 1965) is a Danish former professional footballer who played as a defender. He works for Fremad Amager as the person responsible for the youth players and talents. He is most famous for playing 231 league matches for F.C. Copenhagen. He also made one appearance for the Denmark national team, against the United States in 1993.

After his retirement as a player he was team head in the club, and general manager for F.C. Copenhagen School of Excellence.

In October 2016 he became caretaker manager of Boldklubben Frem together with René Henriksen.

References

External links
 F.C. Copenhagen stats
 

1965 births
Living people
Danish men's footballers
Danish expatriate men's footballers
Danish Superliga players
Ligue 1 players
Boldklubben Frem players
Lille OSC players
Expatriate footballers in France
F.C. Copenhagen players
Denmark international footballers
F.C. Copenhagen non-playing staff
Association football defenders